In Greek mythology, Xuthus (/ˈz(j)uːθəs/; Ancient Greek: Ξοῦθος Xouthos means 'sparrow') may refer to the following characters:

 Xuthus, son of Hellen and father of Ion by Creusa.
 Xuthus, one of the sons of King Aeolus of Aeolian Islands, the keeper of the winds. His mother was named as either Cyane, daughter of Liparus or Telepora (Telepatra), daughter of Laestrygon. Xuthus's siblings were variously given as (1) Agathyrnus, Astyochus, Androcles, Iocastus and Pheraemon; (2) Androcles, Chrysippus, Jocastus, Phalacrus, Pheraemon, Aeole, Astycrateia, Dia, Hephaestia, Iphthe and Periboea; and lastly, (3) Periphas, Agenor, Euchenor, Klymenos, Macareus, Klymene, Kallithyia, Eurygone, Lysidike, Kanake and an unnamed sister. According to various accounts, Aeolus yoked in marriage his sons, including Xuthus, and daughters in order to preserve concord and affection among them. Later on, Xuthus became king of the land in the neighbourhood of Leontini, which is known after him as Xuthia to this day.

Notes

References 

 Apollodorus, The Library with an English Translation by Sir James George Frazer, F.B.A., F.R.S. in 2 Volumes, Cambridge, MA, Harvard University Press; London, William Heinemann Ltd. 1921. ISBN 0-674-99135-4. Online version at the Perseus Digital Library. Greek text available from the same website.
 Diodorus Siculus, The Library of History translated by Charles Henry Oldfather. Twelve volumes. Loeb Classical Library. Cambridge, Massachusetts: Harvard University Press; London: William Heinemann, Ltd. 1989. Vol. 3. Books 4.59–8. Online version at Bill Thayer's Web Site.
 Homer, The Odyssey with an English Translation by A.T. Murray, PH.D. in two volumes. Cambridge, MA., Harvard University Press; London, William Heinemann, Ltd. 1919. . Online version at the Perseus Digital Library. Greek text available from the same website.
Tzetzes, John, Allegories of the Odyssey translated by Goldwyn, Adam J. and Kokkini, Dimitra. Dumbarton Oaks Medieval Library, Harvard University Press, 2015. 

Princes in Greek mythology
Kings in Greek mythology